Yolanda Shrine, or better known as Yolanda Memorial (monument), is a shrine or a monument located at Barangay Anibong, Tacloban, Leyte in Eastern Visayas. The monument was named after Typhoon Haiyan of 2013, which is known in the country as "Super Typhoon Yolanda".

History 
The M/V Eva Jocelyn from Basey, Samar, which the monument's form is based from, was washed ashore in Barangay Anibong of Tacloban, Leyte during the onslaught of the typhoon. The monument is meant to commemorate the victims of the typhoon.

References 

Buildings and structures in Tacloban
Typhoon Haiyan
History of Leyte (province)
Monuments and memorials in the Philippines